Jacob Baart de la Faille (1 June 1886, Leeuwarden – 7 August 1959, Heemstede) compiled the first catalogue raisonné of the work of Vincent van Gogh, published in 1928. The catalogue was revised and republished by an editorial committee in 1970, and this version is considered to be the definitive catalogue of van Gogh's work.

His catalogue numbers are preceded by an 'F': thus F612 refers to The Starry Night.

Shortly after the publication of the original catalogue, de la Faille became involved in a major fraud affair concerning the Berlin art dealer Otto Wacker. De la Faille had certified the authenticity of 30 paintings which were later determined to be fakes.

Biography

Jacob-Baart de la Faille was born to a Dutch father, Cornelis Baart de la Faille, and a Belgian mother, Henriette Adriana Krayenhoff.
At the University of Utrecht he majored in law, not in art.

Writings

 J.-B. de La Faille: L'Epoque française de Van Gogh, MM. Bernheim-Jeune, éditeurs d'art, Paris ("acheve d'imprimer le 25 aout 1927")
 J.-B. de la Faille: L'Œuvre de Vincent van Gogh, catalogue raisonné, ouvrage accompagné de la reproduction de plus de 1.600 tableaux, dessins, aquarelles et gravures du Maître. 6 vols. Les Éditions G. van Oest, Paris & Bruxelles, 1928
2nd edition, revising the catalogue of paintings only, Hyperion, Paris 1937 (comprising editions in English, French, and German)
3rd edition, edited since 1961 by a committee initially including J. G. van Gelder, W. Jos de Gruyter, A. M. Hammacher (chairman), Jan Hulsker and H. Gerson, in 1962 joined by Annet Tellegen-Hoogendoorn, later by Martha Op de Coul and, due to time passing, by others
 J.-B. de la Faille: Les faux Van Gogh, avec 176 reproductions. Les Éditions G. van Oest, Paris & Bruxelles, 1930

Notes

External links

1886 births
1959 deaths
20th-century Dutch lawyers
Dutch art critics
Dutch art dealers
Vincent van Gogh scholars
Art forgery
People from Leeuwarden